Right Here, Right Now is an album by American pianist David Benoit released in 2003, and recorded for the GRP label. The album reached #10 on Billboards Jazz chart.

Track listing
All tracks composed by David Benoit; except where indicated
"Watermelon Man" (Herbie Hancock) - 5:23
"Right Here, Right Now" (David Benoit, Rick Braun) - 4:38
"Le Grand" (David Benoit, Michael Forman) - 5:27
"Don't Know Why" (Jesse Harris) - 4:32
"Jellybeans and Chocolate" (David Benoit, Rick Braun) - 5:13
"Third Encounter" - 5:45
"Swingin' Waikiki" - 5:37
"Don't Let Me Be Lonely Tonight" (James Taylor) - 4:12
"Wistful Thinking" - 4:32
"Quiet Room" - 3:58

 Personnel 
 David Benoit – acoustic piano (1-10), Wurlitzer electric piano (1), arrangements (1-7, 9, 10), string pad (2), synthesizer programming (2), Fender Rhodes (5), Hammond B3 organ (5), string arrangements and conductor (8)
 Pat Kelly – guitar (1, 3, 4, 7-10)
 Tony Maiden – guitar (1, 5)
 Randy Jacobs – guitar (2)
 Peter White – guitar solo (8)
 Kevin Axt – bass (1, 4, 8)
 Nathan East – bass (3, 6)
 Freddie Washington – bass (5)
 Dean Taba – bass (6, 7, 9, 10)
 Land Richards – drums (1, 4, 6, 8)
 Bud Harner – drums (2)
 Steve Ferrone – drums (3, 5, 6)
 Jeff Olson – drums (7, 9)
 Paulinho da Costa – percussion (1, 3, 4, 6, 7)
 Luis Conte – percussion (2)
 Lenny Castro – percussion (5)
 Brad Dutz – percussion (8)
 Euge Groove – tenor saxophone (5)
 Andy Suzuki – tenor saxophone (7, 9)
 Nick Lane – trombone (1, 2), horn arrangements (1, 2, 5)
 Brian Culbertson – trombone (5)
 Rick Braun – trumpet (1), party and fun stuff effects (1), arrangements (1, 2, 3, 5, 6), horn arrangements (1, 2, 5), synthesizer programming (2), computer programming (6), flugelhorn (10)
 Wayne Bergeron – trumpet (2)Strings (Track 8) Sid Page – concertmaster 
 Suzie Katayama – contractor
 Anna Bonn, John Eidsvoog, Julie Eidsvoog and Suzie Katayama – copyists
 Kevin Axt, Dom Genova and David Stone – bass
 Larry Corbett, Dan Smith and Rudy Stein – cello
 Denyse Buffum, Carole Mukogawa, Jimbo Ross and Evan Wilson – viola 
 Eve Butler, Susan Chatman, Kirsten Fife, Larry Greenfield, Sara Parkins, Alyssa Park, Cameron Patrick, Anatoly Rosinsky, John Wittenberg and Margaret Wooten – violin

 Production 
 Rick Braun  – producer 
 Clark Germain – tracking engineer, mixing 
 Steve Sykes – tracking engineer, mixing 
 Jeff Davis – technical assistant 
 Chris Bellman – mastering 
 Bud Harner – A&R direction
 Marsha Black – A&R administration
 Yvonne Wish – project coordinator 
 John Newcott – release coordinator
 Kelly Pratt – release coordinator
 Hollis King – art direction 
 Rika Ichiki – design
 Rocky Schenck – photography 
 Ron Moss at Chapman & Co. Management – managerStudios'
 Recorded at Bill Schnee Studios (North Hollywood, CA); Brauntasoarus Studios (Woodland Hills, CA); Castle Oaks Studios (Calabasas, CA).
 Mixed at Bay 7 Studios (Village Valley, CA) and Rupert House (Woodland Hills, CA).
 Mastered at Bernie Grundman Mastering (Hollywood, CA).

Charts

References

External links
David Benoit-Right Here, Right Now on YouTube
David Benoit Official Site

2003 albums
David Benoit (musician) albums
GRP Records albums